Instituto de Ciencias Exactas (INCE) is a university in Santo Domingo in the Dominican Republic.

It was founded under the auspices of the Foundation National Institute of Sciences Inc., March 18, 1974, through Executive Order No. 5418 and then with the Decree No. 415 of December 19 of that same year, was authorized to become the sixth college in the country. Since the beginning of their educational operations in the classrooms of the Universidad INCE professionals who have graduated, received for educational excellence are inserted prestige in their respective professional fields.

Under the general process of modernization and change that characterizes this world stage, a team of qualified professionals has been built at the University INCE, in order to strengthen it and make it part protagonist of our nation, and be at the forefront in Current demand answers.

The University-National Institute of Sciences, through its Continuing Education Department aims to provide assistance to students and professionals in their educational needs through a variety of programs and academic activities, thus sharing the experience of their powers more than 30 years of existence of our university.

Training continues in UNINCE is of outstanding importance, as constantly providing the possibility to train and graduate courses focused on the following areas:

Economy and Finance,
Accounting,
Business Administration,
Marketing,
Law,
Engineering and 
Architecture

External links
 http://www.ince.edu.do

Universities in the Dominican Republic
Education in Santo Domingo